The deputy prime minister of Malaysia is the second-highest political office in Malaysia. There have been 15 officeholders since the office was created in 1957. The first prime minister of Malaysia, Tunku Abdul Rahman, started the convention of appointing a deputy prime minister, but some cabinets have opted not to appoint a deputy prime minister.

Appointment 

Malaysia has always had a deputy prime minister for most of the time since independence. A prime minister may choose not to appoint a deputy prime minister. The office of deputy prime minister is not provided for in the constitution of Malaysia. At the same time, a prime minister could appoint more than one deputy prime minister, as has occurred before in Singapore.

From August 1957 to May 2018, when the coalition government Barisan Nasional (BN), of which the United Malays National Organisation (UMNO) was the main component party, was the only ruling coalition, and by practice, the UMNO deputy president was usually appointed the deputy prime minister by the prime minister, who was the UMNO president. In the organisational structure of BN, the president and deputy president of UMNO were automatically made the chairman and deputy chairman of BN.

From May 2018 to February 2020, when Pakatan Harapan (PH), a political coalition of four parties, was the only ruling coalition, the holder of the position of deputy prime minister was decided upon by the presidential council of PH. Wan Azizah Wan Ismail, who was the first female holder of office, was the post holder. 

The position has vacant for 16 months since Muhyiddin Yassin was sworn in as prime minister in March 2020 after Perikatan Nasional (PN) was leading ruling coalition until July 2021 after Ismail Sabri Yaakob was appointed to the position. However, he briefly served for 40 days before taking over as prime minister is the shortest-serving officeholder in history.

Since August 2021, when BN is again the leading ruling coalition, there have again been no holders of the office of the deputy prime minister for 13 months before replacing by Ahmad Zahid Hamidi and Fadillah Yusof, first duo deputy prime minister in Malaysian history.

Deaths, resignations and removals from office 
Of the thirteen previous officeholders, seven have stepped up to become Prime Ministers. Of the remaining, one died in office, two resigned, two were removed from office (both who later became Prime Ministers) by the sitting Prime Minister, and two disqualified from office due to defeat in the 2018 general election and collapse of the federal administration in 2020 political crisis.

Ismail Abdul Rahman died in office due to massive heart attack in 1973. Musa Hitam resigned from second Mahathir cabinet over differences with Prime Minister over government policy in 1986. Ghafar Baba resigned from his portfolio following UMNO grassroots lost confidence in his leadership and his position as Deputy President of UMNO was challenged by Anwar Ibrahim in the UMNO's top leadership election. Anwar Ibrahim was the first deputy prime minister to be sacked after being accused and subsequently charged with corruption and sodomy in 1998. Muhyiddin Yassin was the second DPM to be removed from office after being dropped from the Cabinet by former Prime Minister Najib Razak in a reshuffle in 2015. He later was sacked from his party. Wan Azizah Wan Ismail was disqualified from office after the seventh Mahathir cabinet was dissolved due to its fall from the federal administration in 2020.

List of deputy prime ministers of Malaysia 
Colour key (for political parties):

Timeline

See also 
 Senior Minister of Malaysia
 Spouse of the Deputy Prime Minister of Malaysia
 Official state car
 Air transports of heads of state and government

References 

 
Malaysia, Deputy Prime Ministers
Malaysia politics-related lists
Deputy Prime Minister of Malaysia